Afroz Ahmad is an Indian environment scientist and a former civil servant. He possesses United Nations expertise in Environmental management and protection and Leadership. He is credited for integrating the environment with development and ensuring sustainable development in India.

Before joining the Indian service, he was with the United Nations Environment Programme in Germany. Presently, he is a member of the NGT National Green Tribunal Act- Apex court on Environmental Affairs of India. He was Advisor to the Government of Maharashtra for Environment, Forest and Human Rehabilitations Affair with the Status of State Guest.  On 5 December 2014, Ahmad was appointed Member (Environment & Rehabilitation) of the Narmada Control Authority, Ministry of Water Resources (India) Government of India by the Appointments Committee of the Cabinet chaired by Prime Minister of India. Ahmad is Chairman/Member of various high-level national and international committees related to Environment, Forest, Development etc.

Career

In December 2014, Ahmad was appointed Member (Environment & Rehabilitation) in the Narmada Control Authority, Ministry of Water Resources, River Development and Ganga Rejuvenation within the government of India. Before assuming charge as Member, he was Director (Impact Assessment & Rehabilitation) in the Narmada Control Authority.

Ahmad has also worked for the G. B. Pant Institute of Himalayan Environment and Development, Ministry of Environment and Forests (India).

Personal life
Afroz Ahmad married Begum Sadiya Yasmin (Afroz), daughter of poet and politician Bekal Utsahi. Sadiya is a poet and social worker. He has two sons, Dr. Mohamid Afroz khan, who is a medical doctor, and Samman Afroz khan who is on 25 June 2021 nominated as Member Minority Commission Government of Uttar Pradesh for the term of three years, graduated from Cardiff University United Kingdom, and is a research analyst, strategist and a businessman.

Publications
Ahmad is the author of over 100 research papers, articles and reports on environmental management, sustainable development, policy planning, and human rehabilitation, including three papers published by The Royal Swedish Academy of Sciences. Some notable publications are:

Assessment of Environmental Impacts of Sarda Sahayak Canal Irrigation Project of Uttar Pradesh Government, India. Int. J.Environmental Studies, ENGLAND, Vol.28, 123–130, 1986.
Environmental impacts evaluation of Gandak Canal Irrigation Project of Eastern U.P., India and Guidelines for its Management. Int. J. Environmental studies, ENGLAND, Vol.32, pp. 137–149, 1988.
Analysis of Himalayan Environmental Problems and Guidelines with special emphasis on Application of Environmental Impact Assessment (EIA) for the Planning, Management and for sustainable development.  The Environmentalist, ENGLAND, Vol.10, No.4, pp. 281–298, 1990.
Application of Environmental Impact Assessment in Himalayas: An Ecosystem approach for resources conservation and sustainable development.  AMBIO, The Royal Swedish Academy of Sciences (selectors of Nobel Laureates), Stockholm, SWEDEN, Vol.22, No.1, pp. 4–9, February, 1993.
Environmental Impact Assessment for sustainable development: Chittaurgarh Irrigation Project in Outer Himalayas.  AMBIO, The Royal Swedish Academy of Sciences, SWEDEN, Vol.20, No.7, pp. 298–302, November 1991.
Narmada Water Resources Project, India: Implementing Sustainable Development.  AMBIO, The Royal Swedish Academy of Sciences (selectors of Nobel Laureates), Stockholm, SWEDEN, vol. 28 (5) 27, pp. 398–403, August, 1999.
Environmental degradation and possible solution for its restoration – A case study of magnesite mining in Indian Central Himalayas.  U.N. (UNEP)'s Desertification Control Bulletin, No.21, Nairobi, KENYA, pp. 15–23, 1992.
Rehabilitation of the displaced – A comprehensive Policy Approach.  The Administrator, Journal of the Lal Bahadur Shastri National Academy of Administrator, Mussoorie, India, Vol.XLIII, pp. 47–64, April–June, 1998.
Disaster Risk Reduction through Integrated River Basin Management – Policy Approach, NIDM, Ministry of Home Affairs, vol.7, number 1 and 2 December 2013, pp. 181–198.

References

Living people
People from Balrampur
Environmental scientists
Year of birth missing (living people)
United Nations University alumni
University of Jordan alumni
Dr. Ram Manohar Lohia Avadh University alumni